Jogesh Das (1 April 1927 – 9 September 1999) was an Indian short-story writer and novelist from Assam. He was born in 1927. He won the Sahitya Akademi Award for his book Prithivir Oxukh. He was also associated with many cultural organization including the Asom Sahitya Sabha.

Education and career
Das completed his M.A in Assamese literature from Gauhati University in 1953 and then started working as a journalist.Das became the first Sonowal Kachari to be elected as the president of the Asom Sahitya Sabha.

As a writer
Das emerged as a fiction writer in the early fifties. He has written short stories and novels with equal distinction. His first novel Kolpotuwar Mrityu was published in 1953. His second novel Daawor aru nai published in the year 1955 established him as a influential novelist. The book has been translated into numerous other Indian languages by the National Book Trust. His short-story collection Prithivir Oxukh brought him the prestigious Sahitya Akademi Award. His "Folklore of Assam" which was originally written in English and later translated into other Indian languages, is a simple and comprehensive book on Assamese folklore.

Literary works
Some of his notable works are:

Novels
1953: Kolpotuwar Mrityu (Death of Kolpotuwa)
1955: Daawor aaru naai (No more cloud is there)
1959: Jonakir Jui (Flame of the Firefly)
1963: Nirupai-Nirupai (Helpless... Helpless)
1965: Emuthi Dhuli (A Handful of Dust)
1967: Haazaar Phul (Thousands of Flowers)
1972: Nedekha Juir Dhowa (Smoke of an unseen fire)
1972: Obidha (Illegitimate)
1977: Naresh Maloti Aru (Naresh, Maloti and...)

Story books
1956: Popiya Tora (Falling Star)
1958: Andharor Are Are (Under the Shadow of Darkness)
1961: Triveni (Confluence of Three)
1963: Modaror Bedona (Grief of the Sunshine Tree)
1965: Haazaar Lokor Bhir (A crowd of thousands)

English books
1972: Folklore of Assam

Awards
In 1980, Das received the prestigious Sahitya Akademi Award for his collection of short stories Prithivir Oxukh.
In 1994 Das received the Assam Valley Literary Award for his contribution to Assamese literature.

See also
Sahitya Akademi Award to Assamese Writers

References

1927 births
1999 deaths
Indian lecturers
Novelists from Assam
Recipients of the Sahitya Akademi Award in Assamese
Indian male novelists
Writers from Northeast India
Asom Sahitya Sabha Presidents
Recipients of the Assam Valley Literary Award
20th-century Indian novelists
20th-century Indian male writers
20th-century Indian short story writers